Toxoides sichuanensis is a moth in the family Drepanidae. It was described by Zhuang, Owada and Wang in 2014. It is found in China (Sichuan).

References

Moths described in 2014
Thyatirinae